Bamboo Forest, Arashiyama Bamboo Grove or Sagano Bamboo Forest, is a natural forest of bamboo in Arashiyama, Kyoto, Japan. The forest consists mostly of mōsō bamboo (Phyllostachys edulis) and has several pathways for tourists and visitors. The Ministry of the Environment considers it a part of the soundscape of Japan.

Prior to 2015, there was a charge to access the forest.

The forest is not far from Tenryū-ji temple, which is the location of Rinzai School, and the famous Nonomiya Shrine.

Location 
The Sagano Bamboo Forest is situated northwest of Kyoto in Japan near the Tenryū-ji temple. The latitude and longitude coordinates are: 35.009392, 135.667007.

Climate 
The region experiences unpredictable weather, with a cool climate and bright sunlight. The summers are short, hot, and mostly cloudy. The winters are cold, windy, and partly cloudy. It is also wet year-round. The summers last for approximately two months, from late June until mid-September, with an average daily high temperature above . The winters last for approximately three months, from early December to mid-March, with an average daily high temperature below .

References

External links

Photos of Bamboo Forest, Kyoto, Japan

Forests of Japan
Tourist attractions in Kyoto